The 1994 United States Senate election in Delaware was held November 8, 1994. Incumbent Republican U.S. Senator William V. Roth won re-election to a fifth term. William Roth is Delaware's first senator to win a fifth term. He was Delaware's longest-serving senator until Joe Biden won a sixth term in  2002. , this was the last time the Republicans won a U.S. Senate election in Delaware.

Candidates

Democratic 
 Charles Oberly, Attorney General of Delaware

Republican 
 William V. Roth, incumbent U.S. Senator

Polling

Results

See also 
 1994 United States Senate elections

References 

1994
Delaware
1994 Delaware elections